The Artist is a 2011 French romantic comedy-drama film directed and written by Michel Hazanavicius. The film is set in Hollywood between 1927 and 1932 and focuses on a declining film star (played by Jean Dujardin) and a rising actress (played by Berenice Bejo), as silent cinema falls out of fashion and is replaced by the talkies. The film premiered at the 64th Cannes Film Festival on 15 May 2011, where Dujardin won the Best Actor Award. It was released in France on 12 October 2011. Following successful screenings at the Telluride Film Festival, the Toronto International Film Festival, and the New York Film Festival, The Artist was released on 23 November 2011 in the United States. The film earned a worldwide box office total of more than $133 million. Rotten Tomatoes, a review aggregator, surveyed 320 reviews and judged 95% to be positive.

The Artist became the most honoured French film in history. The film garnered several awards and nominations with particular praise for the direction, the acting of its cast, the screenplay, the score, the cinematography, the editing, and the costumes. The film garnered ten nominations at the 84th Academy Awards, and went on to win five awards, including Best Picture, Best Director (Hazanavicius), and Best Actor (Dujardin). It is the first silent feature to win Best Picture after Wings at the inaugural ceremony in 1929 and the first black and white film to win the award since 1993's Schindler's List. Dujardin became the first French actor to win an Oscar. The film was named Best Feature at the 27th Independent Spirit Awards. It received twelve nominations at the 65th British Academy Film Awards, winning seven awards, including Best Film, Best Director, and Best Actor. At the 37th César Awards ceremony, the film earned six awards, including Best Film and Best Actress (Bejo).

The Artist received six nominations at the 69th Golden Globe Awards, winning three, including Best Motion Picture – Musical or Comedy and Best Actor – Motion Picture Musical or Comedy (Dujardin). At the 18th Screen Actors Guild Awards, Dujardin won the award for Outstanding Performance by a Male Actor in a Leading Role. The film won the Best Theatrical Motion Picture at the 23rd Producers Guild of America Awards; Hazanavicius won Best Director at the 64th Directors Guild of America Awards. The 17th Critics' Choice Awards, 77th New York Film Critics Circle Awards, and the 32nd London Film Critics' Circle Awards named the film Best Picture.

Accolades

See also
 2011 in film
 List of Academy Award records

Footnotes

References

External links
 

Lists of accolades by film